John Egan (born 20 October 1992) is an Irish professional footballer who plays as a centre-back for EFL Championship club Sheffield United and the Republic of Ireland national team.

Beginning his career at Sunderland, he had loan spells with Crystal Palace, Sheffield United, Bradford City and Southend United, but was released by the Wearside club without making an appearance for the first team. In July 2014, he joined Gillingham, and was named Player of the Year in his first season, and voted in the League One PFA Team of the Year in his second. In July 2016, he joined Brentford, where he was captain of the club in his second season. In July 2018, he rejoined Sheffield United and was part of the team that got promoted to the Premier League.

Internationally, Egan has represented the Republic of Ireland at under-17, under-19 and under-21 level. He made his debut for the senior side in March 2017.

Early and personal life
Born in Cork, Egan started his career with Greenwood FC in Togher and is the son of former Kerry Gaelic footballer John Egan. His mother, Mary Egan, was a football player and has a League of Ireland medal under her belt. He played hurling and Gaelic football for Bishopstown.

Career

Early career
Egan was loaned by Sunderland to Crystal Palace in January 2012. Egan made his professional debut for Palace in the FA Cup third round playing the full 90 minutes in their 1–0 loss to Derby County. In March 2012, Egan joined Football League One side Sheffield United on a month's loan to ease a defensive crisis, making his début for the Blades that evening in a defeat at Walsall.

In July 2012, Egan was called up by Martin O'Neill for Sunderland's pre-season tour to South Korea to take part in the Peace Cup. He came on as a substitute for the injured Wes Brown in the 3rd place play-off against FC Groningen of the Netherlands, playing 50 minutes of the 3–2 victory. After a solid pre-season, he was praised by Martin O'Neill and handed the number forty-two jersey for the season. At the start of November 2012 after being around the first team Egan signed a three-month loan deal with Bradford City to get games under his belt. He made his début for Bradford on 6 November in a 0–0 draw at home to Chesterfield. His loan was cut short two weeks later after suffering a broken leg, returning having played four games for the Bantams. This injury ruled him out for a year but during his rehab, Egan agreed to a one-year contract extension with Sunderland in March 2013.

On 27 February 2014, Egan joined League Two side Southend United on an emergency loan. His first goal came on 11 March 2014, in a 2–2 draw against Scunthorpe United, where he scored a "spectacular long-distance effort". He later went on to win Southend's 'Goal of the Season' award and the strike was a sensation on YouTube gaining over 35,000 views. On 28 March 2014, Egan extended his loan stay with the Blues until the end of the 2013–14 season.

Gillingham
On 3 July 2014, amid interest from several clubs from League One and the Championship, Egan signed a two-year deal with Gillingham following his release from Sunderland. Egan enjoyed a fantastic debut season with Gillingham, playing 52 times and scoring 5 goals. He also won the main Player of the Year and Away Player of the Year awards for the club to cap off a good year after finishing 12th in League One. In April 2016, Egan was named in the League One PFA Team of the Year for his performances over the 2015–16 season.

Brentford
Egan rejected the offer a new contract by Gillingham at the conclusion of the 2015–16 season and joined Championship club Brentford. He scored his first goals for Brentford when he scored twice in a 2–0 win over Ipswich Town on 16 August 2016. In December 2016 the Professional Football Compensation Committee ruled that Brentford should pay Gillingham an initial net compensation fee of £400,000, an additional £25,000 for every 20 games that he plays for Brentford, up to 80 games, as well as a 20% sell-on fee and a fee of £75,000 in the event that Brentford are promoted to the Premier League within the period of the player's three-year contract.

After the sale of captain Harlee Dean in August 2017 to Birmingham City, Egan was appointed as the new captain of Brentford. During the 2017-18 season, Egan impressed as Brentford kept 15 clean sheets as they finished 9th in the EFL Championship.

Sheffield United
Egan re-joined former loan club Sheffield United on 19 July 2018 on a four-year contract for an undisclosed club-record fee. In his first season with the team, he helped them gain promotion to the Premier League. On 21 August 2020 he signed a new four-year contract, keeping him at the club until 2024.

International career
On 28 March 2017, Egan made his senior international debut, starting in a friendly against Iceland at the Aviva Stadium. He captained his country for the first time in September 2019 in a 3–1 win against Bulgaria at the Aviva Stadium. On 1 September 2021, he was named FAI Senior International Player of the Year for 2020, the same day that he scored his first international goal in a 2022 World Cup qualifier: a 2-1 loss against Portugal.

Career statistics

Club

International

International goals
Scores and results list Ireland's goal tally first.

Honours
Sheffield United
EFL Championship runner-up: 2018–19

Individual
Gillingham Player of the Year: 2014–15
PFA Team of the Year: 2015–16 League One
Sheffield United Community Player of the Year: 2019–20, 2020–21
FAI Senior International Player of the Year: 2020

References

External links

1992 births
Living people
Association football defenders
Association footballers from Cork (city)
Bishopstown Gaelic footballers
Bishopstown hurlers
Dual players
Gaelic footballers who switched code
English Football League players
Premier League players
Republic of Ireland association footballers
Republic of Ireland international footballers
Republic of Ireland under-21 international footballers
Republic of Ireland youth international footballers
Sunderland A.F.C. players
Crystal Palace F.C. players
Sheffield United F.C. players
Bradford City A.F.C. players
Southend United F.C. players
Gillingham F.C. players
Brentford F.C. players
Republic of Ireland expatriate association footballers